Xenorhabdus cabanillasii  is a bacterium from the genus of Xenorhabdus which has been isolated from the nematode Steinernema riobrave in Texas in the United States. Xenorhabdus cabanillasii produces the antifungal metabolite Cabanillasin.

References

Further reading

External links
Type strain of Xenorhabdus cabanillasii at BacDive -  the Bacterial Diversity Metadatabase

Bacteria described in 2006